In enzymology, a diaminobutyrate-pyruvate transaminase is an enzyme that catalyzes the chemical reaction

L-2,4-diaminobutanoate + pyruvate  L-aspartate 4-semialdehyde + L-alanine

Thus, the two substrates of this enzyme are L-2,4-diaminobutanoate and pyruvate, whereas its two products are L-aspartate 4-semialdehyde and L-alanine.

This enzyme belongs to the family of transferases, specifically the transaminases, which transfer nitrogenous groups.  The systematic name of this enzyme class is L-2,4-diaminobutanoate:pyruvate aminotransferase. Other names in common use include diaminobutyrate-pyruvate aminotransferase, and L-diaminobutyric acid transaminase.  It employs one cofactor, pyridoxal phosphate.

References

 

EC 2.6.1
Pyridoxal phosphate enzymes
Enzymes of unknown structure